The water polo events at the 1994 World Aquatics Championships were held from 1 to 11 September 1994, in Rome, Italy.

Medal summary

Medal table

Medalists

References

 
1994
World Aquatics Championships
Water polo